John Northampton was Mayor of London.

John Northampton may also refer to:

John Northampton (priest)
John Northampton (Southwark MP)